Angelique Rodríguez (born 26 August 1975) is a Puerto Rican diver. She competed at the 2000 Summer Olympics and the 2004 Summer Olympics.

References

External links
 

1975 births
Living people
Puerto Rican female divers
Olympic divers of Puerto Rico
Divers at the 2000 Summer Olympics
Divers at the 2004 Summer Olympics
Place of birth missing (living people)